The Corporación de Radio y Televisión Española, S.A., known as Radiotelevisión Española or  RTVE, is the state-owned public corporation that assumed in 2007 the indirect management of the Spanish public radio and television service known as Ente Público Radiotelevisión Española.

It provides multi-station television (TVE) and radio services (RNE), as well as online and streaming services. Since the entry into force of the Ley de Financiación de RTVE in 2009, RTVE is primarily funded by a combination of subsidies from the General State Budget and a fee levied on the private agents' gross revenue (3.0 % for private free-to-air channels, a 1.5 % for private subscription channels and a 0.9 % for telecom companies).

RTVE is a full member of the European Broadcasting Union (EBU). The corporation's central headquarters are located in Pozuelo de Alarcón.

History

Precedents 

Spanish state-wide public broadcasting services have undergone numerous restructurings and reorganisations throughout its history, and have assumed numerous identities. Their history may be traced back to the first radio broadcasts of Radio Nacional de España (RNE) from Salamanca, developed as propaganda tool for the Rebel faction during the Spanish Civil War. RNE was founded on 19 January 1937 and was subservient to the State Delegation for Press and Propaganda led by Vicente Gay Forner.

In July 1945, in the wake of the transfer of responsibilities over Press and Propaganda to the Ministry of National Education, radio broadcasting became a standalone directorate general: the Dirección General de Radiodifusión ('Directorate General for Radio Broadcasting').

After some time on trial, the first Televisión Española (TVE) signal broadcast on 28 October 1956 from the Madrid's Paseo de la Habana, reaching the roughly 600 television receivers existing in Madrid at the time. In October 1973, the two networks for respectively radio and television broadcasting, RNE and TVE, were consolidated into the Servicio Público Centralizado Radiotelevisión Española ('RTVE Centralised Public Service'). Up until the 1980s, with the creation of regional broadcasters ETB and TV3, TVE held the monopoly on television broadcasting in the country.

In 1979, TVE and RNE were joined by Radiocadena Española (RCE), an old radio service that, unlike RNE, could broadcast commercials.
The former cinema newsreels service NO-DO was merged into RTVE to be dismantled in 1981. Since then, the NO-DO archives are property of RTVE and its conservation is on their hands and Filmoteca Nacional's. In 1989, RCE was dismantled and its radio service was merged into RNE.

RTVE Corporation 
In accordance with the Law of State Radio and Television of 5 June 2006, and in the face of an enormous deficit, the RTVE Public Body and the companies TVE, S.A. and RNE, S.A. were dissolved, and on 1 January 2007, Corporación RTVE came into existence. RTVE was thus constituted as a fully autonomous sociedad mercantil estatal, assuming the corporate form of a sociedad anónima fully participated by the State. For the first time, the chair of the public broadcasting services was appointed by the Cortes Generales (the legislative) rather than by the Government of Spain (the executive), as it had been previously the case with the directors-general of the ente público and the servicio público de radiodifusión.

As part of the 2007 restructuring, a controversial plan was put into action to reduce the workforce by 4,855 through attrition and retirement incentives.

In 2012 political tensions associated with the austerity policies enacted by the ruling right-leaning People's Party (PP) resulted in departures of personnel, which were interpreted by interviewed journalists as an effort to purge critical political comment from RTVE's content. In 2012 the PP began staffing RTVE with party veterans. Considerable controversy was caused when Ana Pastor was fired.

On 11 June 2013, RTVE was one of the few known European broadcasters to condemn and criticise the closure of Greece's state broadcaster ERT.

In December 2018, RTVE launched a web with Filmoteca Española, which is available via Internet with more than 4000 videos of Spanish films and documentaries.

Amid the inability to reach a parliamentary agreement for the renovation of the administration board of RTVE, Rosa María Mateo was appointed as Provisional Sole Administrator in July 2018. In February 2021, the renovation was unblocked and José Manuel Pérez Tornero was shortlisted as the future chairman of the corporation. Thus, the new board was constituted on 26 March 2021.

In October 2021, the corporation's decision to deny a travel of a group of RTVE journalists to Tindouf to attend an event organised by the Polisario Front and thus be presumably able to interview Brahim Ghali stirred controversy and led to the renunciation of both TVE and RNE heads of the international informative services.

Services

Television 

RTVE's own television service comes under the Televisión Española (TVE) division of RTVE.

The domestic offer provided by TVE comprises two generalist channels (La 1 and La 2) and three thematic channels: Teledeporte (sports programming), 24 Horas (news) and Clan (children's programming). Together with the broadcast of the standard definition signal, they are also available in High-definition.

Regarding international broadcasting, TVE commercializes the following channels: TVE Internacional, 24 Horas Internacional, and Clan Internacional.

Radio 

RTVE's radio stations come under the Radio Nacional de España (RNE) division of RTVE.

The domestic offer provided by RNE includes the following radio stations: Radio Nacional (generalist radio station), Radio Clásica (classical music), Radio 3 (cultural and alternative programming aimed at young people), Ràdio 4 (Catalan-language station broadcast in Catalonia and Andorra) and Radio 5 (24-hour radio news station).

Radio Exterior (REE) is the RNE's international broadcasting service on short wave, with an audience of 80 million listeners (surpassed only by the BBC and Vatican Radio). This station is also transmitted via DAB for Spain and by satellite. Besides Spanish, REE also transmits programming in French, Arabic, Ladino, Portuguese, Russian and English.

Internet

RTVE's online portal is located at 'rtve.es'. The website is managed by RTVE's Interactive Media department. It hosts the corporation's over-the-top media service, RTVE Play, which replaced the old 'RTVE a la carta' in June 2021, adding additional features. RTVE streams content in the Americas on the 'RTVE Play+' pay subscription service.

Besides the catalogue from the RTVE Archive, it allows users to listen and watch live feeds of the network's radio and television stations, as well as original programming from Playz, a hub of streaming content aimed towards a young audience. The RTVE.es portal also features blogs and news stories.

Other 
RTVE is also responsible for the Instituto Oficial de Radio y Televisión (IORTV, Official Institute of Radio and TV) and the Orquesta Sinfónica y Coro de RTVE (RTVE Symphony Orchestra and Choir). RTVE (as RNE) was admitted to full active membership of the European Broadcasting Union in 1955. TVE joined the Eurovision Network in 1960. The corporation has contributed to the production of more than 300 films, many of which have received awards at international film festivals around the world. From 1979 to 1987, a second radio network known as Radiocadena Española was also a part of RTVE. RCE stations, unlike RNE, showed advertising. RCE was merged into RNE between 1987 and 1989. NO-DO was also merged into RTVE in 1980. Since NO-DO's closure in 1982, RTVE and Filmoteca Española are responsible for maintaining NO-DO's archives.

Management 

The Board of the RTVE is the main body of RTVE, and appoints the executive officers of RTVE and its companies, approves its organisation, and approves most major activities. The Board is composed of 12 members; 8 members are chosen by Congress and 4 by the Senate, each by two-thirds majority and each for a non-renewable mandate of 6 years, and 2 members appointed by Congress must be proposed by the 2 main trade unions at RTVE.

The Chair has operational control of day-to-day operations, in order to execute the decisions and guidance of the Board. The Chair is appointed by, and may be dismissed by, Congress. Before the 2006 Act, this position was filled by the role of the Director General, which had a de facto total control of RTVE. In practice, the Director General had been chosen by the Government for their political profile.

Corporación RTVE is described as a "state mercantile society" (sociedad mercantil estatal) with special autonomy and independence from the government and the general state administration, and it performs its functions through TVE and RNE.

Most staff are civil servants. The News Council is an internal supervisory body composed of RTVE journalists with the aim of safeguarding RTVE's independence.

The current RTVE board constituted on 26 March 2021 is chaired by José Manuel Pérez Tornero, also featuring Elena Sánchez Caballero, Carmen Sastre, Roberto Lakidain, Consuelo Aparicio and Concepción Cascajosa as board members. Upon the renunciation of Pérez Tornero in September 2022, Elena Sánchez Caballero was elected by the board as the acting chair of the RTVE corporation.

Funding 
Since the entry into force of the Ley de Financiación de RTVE in 2009, RTVE is primarily funded by a combination of subsidies from the General State Budget and a fee levied on the private agents' gross revenue (3.0 % for private free-to-air channels, a 1.5 % for private subscription channels and a 0.9 % for telecom companies). 

As of 2021, a preliminary draft for the Ley General de Comunicación Audiovisual reportedly foresees the extension of the 1.5% fee on gross revenues to international streaming platforms offering services in Spain (such as Netflix, HBO, Disney+, Amazon Prime Video or YouTube) and the drop of the 0.9% fee for telecom companies, although the latter will continue contributing in terms of the fee levied for the occupation of the spectrum. RTVE will also be able to monetize limited forms of advertising, such as sponsorships and advertising in its international channels.

References

Bibliography

External links

  
 
 

 
Publicly funded broadcasters
State media